Dubois Crossroads is an unincorporated community in Harbison Township, Dubois County, in the U.S. state of Indiana.

History
Dubois Crossroads had its start in the 1920s when a filling station opened at the intersection.

Geography

References

External links

Unincorporated communities in Dubois County, Indiana
Unincorporated communities in Indiana
1920s establishments in Indiana
Populated places established in the 1920s